Richard D. Gitlin (born April 25, 1943) is an electrical engineer, inventor, research executive, and academic whose principal places of employment were Bell Labs and the University of South Florida (USF). He is known for his work on digital subscriber line (DSL), multi-code CDMA, and smart MIMO antenna technology all while at Bell Labs.

Education and career
Gitlin was born in Brooklyn, New York and graduated from the noted James Madison High School in 1959. He received a BEE (with honors) in electrical engineering from The City College of New York (CCNY) in 1964, followed by an MSEE in 1965 and a Doctor of Engineering Science in 1969, both from Columbia University. Gitlin's research, under the supervision of Dr. William R. Bennett, was in the area of adaptive signal processing used early machine learning techniques for signal classification and detection.

After receiving his doctorate, Gitlin joined Bell Laboratories, where he worked for 32 years in research and development of digital communications, broadband networking, and wireless systems. His work there resulted in many innovative products, including: co-invention of DSL (digital subscriber line), invention of multicode CDMA (used in 3G wireless), and pioneering the use of smart antennas (“MIMO”) for wireless systems. Earlier in his career, Gitlin led the team that created the first V.32/V.34 duplex, high-speed modems that used echo cancellation, fractionally spaced equalization, and trellis coded modulation.

At his retirement in 2001, Gitlin was Senior VP for Communications and Networking Research at Bell Labs (then reorganized as Lucent), leading a multi-national research organization with over 500 professionals. After retiring from Bell Labs, he was visiting professor of Electrical Engineering at Columbia University,  Chief Technology Officer of  NEC Labs America, CTO of Hammerhead Systems, a venture funded networking company in Silicon Valley, and in 2008 he joined USF as a faculty member.

He also served on the Board of Directors of PCTEL (NASDAQ: PCTI).

At the University of South Florida (USF) Gitlin was a State of Florida 21st Century Scholar, Distinguished University Professor, and the Agere Systems Chaired Professor of Electrical Engineering. Currently, he is Distinguished University Professor, Emeritus and a Professor in USF's Institute for Advanced Discovery & Innovation.

At USF his research had two major themes: (1) the intersection of communications with medicine to advance minimally invasive surgery and other cyber-physical health care systems and devices, such as a vectorcardiogram that uses machine learning to provide predictive 24/7 diagnostic quality cardiac care in a compact personal device and (2) creating novel, foundational technologies to ensure ultra-reliability, low latency, and other advanced technological capabilities for the emerging 5G wireless and IoT wireless networks, as well as future 6G wireless networks. He retired from USF in 2019.

Gitlin has co-authored a data communications text, published more than 175 papers, including 3 prize-winning papers, and holds 75 US patents. He currently lives with his wife, Barbara, in La Jolla, CA.

Dr. Gitlin has made significant research contributions which have been sustained and prolific over several decades and he continues to be a leading thinker, innovator, and a global technology leader.

Honors and awards
 AAAS Fellow  (2020)
Academy of Science, Engineering, and Medicine of Florida (2018)
Florida Inventors Hall of Fame (2017)
Distinguished University Professor-University of South Florida (2013)
 Charter Fellow of the National Academy of Inventors (NAI) (2012)
 National Academy of Engineering, for “contributions to communications systems and networking” (2005)
 Thomas Alva Edison patent award from the R&D Council of New Jersey (2005)
 AT&T Bell Labs Fellow, for “contributions to data communications” (1987)
 IEEE Fellow for “contributions to data communications techniques” (1986)
 IEEE Communications Society Steven O. Rice Award (1995)
 IEEE Communications Society Frederick Ellersick Award (1994)
 Bell System Technical Journal Award (1982)
 Honor Societies: Tau Beta Pi, Eta Kappa Nu, and Sigma Xi

References

External links 
 Richard Gitlin’s personal website iWINLAB
 National Academy of Engineering Dr. Richard D. Gitlin
 National Academy of Inventors - PDF
 USF’s Richard Gitlin elected to the Florida Inventors Hall of Fame
 Mr. Wizard’s Fantastic Voyage
WUSF Interview on election to the Florida Inventors Hall of Fame, April 2017
Interview at USF
Remarks at Madison Wall of Distinction installation, April 29, 2018

Living people
1943 births
Scientists at Bell Labs
Electrical engineering academics
Members of the United States National Academy of Engineering
Fellow Members of the IEEE
University of South Florida faculty
James Madison High School (Brooklyn) alumni
City College of New York alumni
Columbia School of Engineering and Applied Science alumni
American textbook writers